A feminist is a person who supports or engages in feminism.

Feminist(s) may also refer to:

 The Feminists, an American feminist group that was active from 1968 to 1973
 Feminist (Pugad Baboy), a story arc in the comic strip Pugad Baboy

See also
 List of feminists